Gilbert Lazard ( – ) was a French linguist and Iranologist. His works include the study of various Iranian languages, translations of classical Persian poetry, and research on linguistic typology, notably on morphosyntactic alignment. He also studied various Polynesian languages most notably the Tahitian language.

Career 

Gilbert Lazard studied at the École normale supérieure, graduated in 1946 (agrégation de grammaire) and 1948 (Persian language diploma of the École nationale des langues orientales vivantes, now the Institut national des langues et civilisations orientales - INALCO). He became a professor of Persian at INALCO from 1958 to 1966.

From 1951 to 1969, he was in charge of the Iranian civilization course at the Sorbonne, where he became a lecturer (maître de conférences) (in 1960) and a professor (in 1966) for Iranian language and civilization . From 1969 to 1981, he taught at the University of Paris III: Sorbonne Nouvelle, where he was from 1969 to 1974 the director of the Orientalism department and from 1972 to 1987 the director of the Institute for Iranian studies (Institut d'études iraniennes).

From 1972 to 1990, he held the research position of directeur d'études for linguistics and Iranian philology at the École pratique des hautes études.

From 1972 to 1983, he led the research team on Iranian language, literature and culture associated to the Centre national de la recherche scientifique (CNRS) and the University of Paris III: Sorbonne Nouvelle. From 1984 to 1993, he held responsibility for the CNRS research group « Recherche interlinguistique sur les variations d’actance et leurs corrélats » (Interlinguistic research on actancy variations and their correlates).

On November 14, 1980, he was elected an ordinary member of the Académie des inscriptions et belles-lettres.

He was a member of numerous learned societies, including the Association pour l’avancement des études iraniennes, the Société de linguistique de Paris, the Société asiatique and the Association for Linguistic Typology.

 Notes and references 

 Bibliography 
 Lazard, Gilbert. Actancy'', Berlin, Boston: De Gruyter Mouton, 2011. https://doi.org/10.1515/9783110808100

1920 births
2018 deaths
Academic staff of Sorbonne Nouvelle University Paris 3
Linguists from France
Grammarians of Persian
French Iranologists
Translators from Persian
École Normale Supérieure alumni
Academic staff of the École pratique des hautes études
Linguists of Iranian languages
Linguists of Persian
Members of the Académie des Inscriptions et Belles-Lettres
Members of the Société Asiatique
20th-century translators